Babbie is a town in Covington County, Alabama, United States. At the 2020 census, the population was 625. It incorporated in 1957.

Geography
Babbie is located in eastern Covington County at  (31.300460, -86.319293). It is bordered to the east by the city of Opp.

Demographics

2000 Census data
At the 2000 census there were 627 people, 258 households, and 192 families in the town. There were 284 housing units at an average density of 24.6 per square mile (9.5/km2). The racial makeup of the town was 98.88% White, 0.16% Black or African American, 0.32% Asian, 0.16% from other races, and 0.48% from two or more races.

Of the 258 households 29.1% had children under the age of 18 living with them, 64.0% were married couples living together, 8.9% had a female householder with no husband present, and 25.2% were non-families. 23.6% of households were one person and 7.8% were one person aged 65 or older. The average household size was 2.43 and the average family size was 2.87.

The age distribution was 22.3% under the age of 18, 7.8% from 18 to 24, 30.1% from 25 to 44, 25.5% from 45 to 64, and 14.2% 65 or older. The median age was 39 years. For every 100 females, there were 101.6 males. For every 100 females age 18 and over, there were 94.8 males.

The median household income was $26,328 and the median family income  was $31,875. Males had a median income of $27,054 versus $17,000 for females. The per capita income for the town was $13,628. About 16.6% of families and 14.8% of the population were below the poverty line, including 21.6% of those under age 18 and 15.6% of those age 65 or over.

References 

Towns in Covington County, Alabama
Towns in Alabama
1957 establishments in Alabama